Harvest is an album by bassist Richard Davis recorded in 1977 but not released on the Muse label until 1979.

Reception
Allmusic awarded the album 3 stars calling it "Most interesting listening for the adventurous jazz lover".

Track listing 
All compositions by Bill Lee and Richard Davis except as indicated
 "Forest Flower" (Charles Lloyd) - 4:58   
 "This Masquerade" (Leon Russell) - 6:30   
 "Half Pass" - 4:13   
 "Three Flowers" (McCoy Tyner) - 1:55   
 "Windflower" (Sara Casey) - 7:19   
 "Passion Flower" (Billy Strayhorn) - 4:19   
 "A Third Away" - 4:33   
 "Take the "A" Train" (Strayhorn) - 3:10   
 "Forest Flower (Reprise)" (Lloyd) - 1:57

Personnel 
Richard Davis - bass 
James Spaulding - alto saxophone (tracks 5-8)
Ted Dunbar - guitar (tracks 1-3, 5 & 6)
Consuela Moore - piano (tracks 1-6 & 9)
Bill Lee - bass (tracks 1-6 & 8)
Billy Hart (tracks 5-8), Freddie Waits (tracks 1-3, 5 & 6) - drums

References 

Richard Davis (bassist) albums
1979 albums
Muse Records albums